Nicolaus Copernicus University in Toruń or NCU (UMK) is located in Toruń, Poland. It is named after Nicolaus Copernicus, who was born in Toruń in 1473.

History

The beginnings of higher education in Toruń
The first institution of higher education in Torun, the Toruń Academic Gymnasium was founded in 1568 on Piekary street. It was one of the first universities in northern Poland. The Academic Gymnasium was the precursor to scientific and cultural life (including the first museum created in 1594) in the region. Thanks to the efforts of Heinrich Stroband, city mayor in 1594, academics in Toruń received good working conditions for teaching and research. Among his professors in the seventeenth and eighteenth centuries were meritorious scholars of Polish and Prussian history, authors of textbooks and papers from various disciplines of humanities, and associates scientific journals.

The establishment of the university in a modern form began in the nineteenth century. During the partitions of Poland the Prussian government planned to create a University of Theology, which was to include faculties of law and economics, unfortunately this project did not materialise.

In the interwar period the city authorities of Toruń again sought to establish a university. Soon after the annexation of Pomerania to the reborn Poland in 1920, a new phase of efforts to develop the university began. Even before 1920 the Supreme People's Council had considered the proposal to establish higher educational institutions in the Polish territories annexed by Prussia at the University of Gdansk and in Toruń. However, political developments and the uncertain future of Pomerania prompted the council's leadership to accept the December 1918 resolution of the Sejm to overlook Toruń as a location for a new university and instead go ahead with the development of a university in Poznań.

In 1920, the first declaration requesting the establishment of a university was put forward in November by the National Workers Party whose members chose Toruń-born Nicolaus Copernicus to be the patron of the university. For this purpose a number of educational societies, such as the Baltic Institute (later transferred to Gdynia, and then to Gdańsk) amongst others, were established in the town.

Finally in 1938 it was decided to set up the Nicolaus Copernicus University in Toruń as a subsidiary of Poznań's Adam Mickiewicz University; work was to start at the beginning of 1940. This program, however, was interrupted by World War II. It was not until 1947, (two years after the creation of the Nicolaus Copernicus University) that prof. Karol Gorski revealed that before the outbreak of World War II there was an approved plan to open Poznań University long-distance division in Toruń in 1940, to teach the humanities and theology.

Faculties

Faculty of Biology and Environmental Protection
Faculty of Chemistry
Faculty of Earth Sciences
Faculty of Economic Sciences and Management
Faculty of Education Sciences
Faculty of Fine Arts
Faculty of Health Sciences
Faculty of History
Faculty of Humanities
Faculty of Languages
Faculty of Law and Administration
Faculty of Mathematics and Computer Science
Faculty of Medicine
Faculty of Pharmacy
Faculty of Political Science and International Studies
Faculty of Physics, Astronomy and Informatics
Faculty of Theology

Staff

Number of students

Levels of study offered by institution
Shorter/intermediate university level qualifications
First main university level final qualifications
Advanced/postgraduate study
Doctorate
Higher/post doctorate

Diplomas and degrees
Licentiate (3 years undergraduate degree. Equivalent to Bachelor of Science or Bachelor of Arts)
Engineer (3 or 3.5 years technical degree. Equivalent to Bachelor of Engineering)
Magister (5 years degree equivalent to a course-based Masters programme)
Ph.D. Degree
Habilitated Doctor Degree.

Rankings 

In 2017, Times Higher Education ranked the university within the 801-1000 band globally.

International cooperation
University of Padua – Italy 
University of Ferrara – Italy 
Sapienza University of Rome – Italy 
University of Oldenburg – Germany 
University of Göttingen – Germany 
University of Bamberg, – Germany 
Universität Rostock – Germany 
University of Greifswald – Germany 
Bundeswehr University Munich – Germany 
Université d’Angers – France 
Nottingham Trent University – United Kingdom
Dominican University – USA
Cranfield University – United Kingdom

Notable alumni
Piotr Bojańczyk, (born 1946), former national champion, ice dancing
Iwona Chmielewska (born 1960), author and illustrator
Zbigniew Herbert, (1924–1998), poet
Piotr Hofmański (born 1956), jurist and judge, President of the International Criminal Court (ICC)
Elżbieta Jabłońska (born 1970), multidisciplinary visual artist
Maciej Konacki, (born 1972), astronomer
Mariusz Lemańczyk, (born 1958), mathematician
Zbigniew Nowek, (born 1959), former head of the Polish Intelligence Agency
Janina Ochojska (born 1955), astronomer, humanitarian and social activist
Andrzej Person, (born 1951), senator and sports journalist
Jan Rompsczi, (1913–1969), poet and ethnographer
Janusz Leon Wiśniewski (born 1954), scientist and writer
Aleksander Wolszczan, (born 1946), astronomer
Jacek Yerka (born 1952), painter
Tomasz Zaboklicki, (born 1958), CEO of PESA SA

See also
 The Nicolaus Copernicus University Library
 The Nicolaus Copernicus University Press
 Nicolaus Copernicus University Polar Station
 Kujawsko-Pomorska Digital Library
 National Laboratory of Atomic, Molecular and Optical Physics

References

External links
 Official website (english version)
 Official website (polish version)
 Official Students' Forum

 
Universities and colleges in Poland
1945 establishments in Poland
Educational institutions established in 1945